The Open de Andalucia was a European Tour men's professional golf tournament which was played from 2007 to 2012. The event was held in the Andalusia region of Spain.

History
Between 1992 and 1995, and again in 1999, former European Tour event, the Turespana Masters, was held in the Andalusia region and titled as the Turespana Masters Open de Andalucia, with winners including future major champion and World Number 1 Vijay Singh, and local favourite Miguel Ángel Jiménez.

This incarnation of the Open de Andalucia owes its origins indirectly to the PGA Tour's decision to reschedule The Players Championship from March to May. In response, the European Tour decided to move the British Masters, which is one of its higher profile tournaments, from that same week in May to a September slot when more top players would be available. The Valle Romano Open de Andalucia was created to fill the gap in the schedule this move created. It has been promoted by the personal companies of the Spanish European Tour members Miguel Ángel Jiménez and Gonzalo Fernández-Castaño.

The first two events were staged at the Aloha Golf Club near Marbella, before the tournament was moved to the Real Club de Golf de Sevilla near Seville for the 2009 season at the request of sponsors.

At the 2009 Open de Andalucia, European Ryder Cup veteran Colin Montgomerie became the 18th player to reach the 500 appearance mark on the European Tour. He started the tournament impressively with a five under par 67, for a share of second place after the first round. His challenge faded however, and he finished tied for 31st place at level-par, 14 strokes behind the winner, Søren Kjeldsen of Denmark. Kjeldsen had broken the course record with a 10-under-par 62 on Saturday to move into the lead, and a level-par final round of 72 on Sunday was enough to see off the challenge of Scot David Drysdale by three strokes.

Winners

References

External links

Coverage on European Tour's official site
Launch announcement from europeantour.com

Former European Tour events
Golf tournaments in Spain
Recurring sporting events established in 2007
Recurring sporting events disestablished in 2012
Defunct sports competitions in Spain